Ravensworth Nurseries Ltd, (historically trading as Bradbrook & Hannah) is an English horticultural business and garden centre located in Ravensworth, North Yorkshire.

It supplies garden centres and retailers across the United Kingdom as well as its own on-site sales.

History
The business was founded by Doug Bradbrook and his brother-in-law William Hannah in 1966.

The business began by growing lettuces and tomatoes, but increased competition from the Common Market and rising heating costs saw them move into bedding plants and later pot plants such as poinsettias. They are one of only two businesses that grow poinsettias in the United Kingdom, growing around 18,000 of the plants in 2012.

In 1996 they erected the world's largest hanging basket.

By 2006, the business had a £1.8 million annual turnover, six acres of glasshouses and employed around 35 people. Since 2006 the business has used an eco-friendly woodchip burner to heat three of its glasshouses. Waste wood is delivered for free by local companies, and the wood is chipped on site, once a week.

References

Horticultural companies of the United Kingdom
Garden centres
Retail companies of England
British companies established in 1966
Retail companies established in 1966
1966 establishments in England
Companies based in Richmondshire